Bandu or Bandoo or Bon Dow or Bondow may refer to:
 Bandu, Dashti, Bushehr Province
 Bandu, Kangan, Bushehr Province